The BMW M328 is an overhead valve straight-six petrol internal combustion engine which was produced from 1936 to 1940. It was a high-performance development of the BMW M78 engine that was produced alongside the M78.

Compared with the M78, the M328 has an aluminium cross-flow cylinder head with hemispherical combustion chambers.

The M328 was used in the BMW 328 and BMW 327/28 coupes.

After World War II the engine was also licensed to Bristol Cars in the United Kingdom.



Design 
The M328 had an unusual valvetrain design; although the camshaft is located in the engine block, the exhaust valves are actuated by a transverse pushrod from the intake valves. This results in a valve layout similar to a DOHC engine.

Fuel supply was via three Solex "30 JF downdraft" carburetors.

The M328 engine has a compression ratio of 7.5:1 and produces  at 5000 rpm.

Versions 

Applications:
 1936-1940 328
 1937-1940 327/28

See also 
 BMW
 List of BMW engines

References

Notes

Bibliography

M328
Straight-six engines
Gasoline engines by model